Real Futsal Arzignano is a futsal club based in Arzignano, Italy.

Honours
 2  Serie A:
2003/04, 2005/06
 1  Coppa Italia:
2009
 2  Supercoppa Italiana:
2004 - 2006
 1 Coppa Italia di Serie B:
1998/99
 1 Supercoppa Veneto:
1999
 1 Serie B:
1998/99

See also
 Serie A1 (Futsal)
 Divisione Calcio a 5

References

External links
 Official site

Futsal clubs in Italy